Giannis Pasas (born 7 October 1990) is a Greek professional footballer who plays as a left winger for Super League 2 club Kalamata.

Career

Panetolikos
Pasas started his football with Panetolikos in 2008. In 2009, he was loaned out to Akarnanikos. Until 2014 he appeared in 48 matches for Panaitolikos scoring in 6 occasions.

Iraklis
On 10 July 2014 he signed for Iraklis. He debuted for Iraklis in a cup match against Lamia. During his three seasons with the club he played in 89 games having 7 goals and 8 assists.

Aris
On 27 July 2017 Football League club Aris announced the signing of the ex-Iraklis player. On 28 October 2017 he scored his first goal in 2–1 home loss against Panionios for the cup. Only three days later he scored in the season's opener, a 5–0 home win against Aiginiakos. On 31 January 2018 he scored a 90th-minute winner in an away win against Veria. On 24 March 2018 he scored a winner in a 3–2 away win against Kissamikos, after an assist from Markos Dounis.

Return to Iraklis
On 8 August 2018, he returned to Iraklis on a two-year contract. On 2 December 2018, he scored in a 3–0 away win against Aittitos Spata.

References

External links
Profile at Onsports.gr

1990 births
Living people
Greek footballers
Iraklis Thessaloniki F.C. players
Panetolikos F.C. players
Veria NFC players
Super League Greece players
Association football forwards
Footballers from Western Greece
People from Aetolia-Acarnania